The Finnish Wheelchair Curling Championship is the national championship of wheelchair curling in Finland. It has been held annually since 2008 to 2013, organized by Finnish Curling Association.


List of champions and medallists

Teams line-up in order: skip/fourth, third, second, lead, alternate, coach; skips marked bold.

See also
Finnish Men's Curling Championship
Finnish Women's Curling Championship
Finnish Mixed Curling Championship
Finnish Mixed Doubles Curling Championship
Finnish Junior Curling Championships

References

Curling competitions in Finland
Curling
Recurring sporting events established in 2008
National curling championships
2008 establishments in Finland
2013 disestablishments in Finland